Neznakomka is the fourteenth studio album by Russian pop-singer Philipp Kirkorov, released in 2003 by Sony Russia.

Track listing

Songwriters
Track 1 written by Vladimir Stepanov and Kai Metov.  Track 2 written by Oleg Popkov.  Track 3 written by Andrei Morsin and Ivan Peev.  Track 4 written by Andrei Morsin, Leopoldo Mendez, Pablo Cepeda, Patrik Henzel, Rasmus Lindwall and Robert Watz. Track 5 written by Igor Nikolaev.  Track 6 written by Andrei Morsin and Ron Malo.  Track 7 written by Andrei Morsin, Ingrid Alberini and Marco Soncini.  Track 8 written by Evgeny Muravyov and Arkady Ukupnik.  Track 9 written by Mirit Shem Or and Zvika Pick.

Singles 
 "Roza Chainaya" (duet with Masha Rasputina)
 "Zestokaya Lubov`" 
 "Nemnogo Zal`"
 "Radio-baby"

2003 albums
Philipp Kirkorov albums